23 is the third album from the Japanese duo, Rythem. It was released on October 1, 2008 under their label, Sony Music Entertainment Japan. This album contains songs from their singles Hotarubi, Bitter & Sweet, Kubisuji Line and their recent single Love Call/Akari no Arika.

This album comes up in a regular edition (AICL-1964) and a limited edition (AICL-1962) which will contain the PV for Love Call, Kubisuji Line, Bitter & Sweet, and some documentaries.

Track listing
東京メトロガール / Tokyo Metro Girl
Love Call (RYTHEM with キマグレン)
猫背 -original- / Nekoze -original-
首すじライン / Kubisuji Line
夏メロ / Natsu Mero
アイシカタ / Aishikata
SMILE
Joyful
Like a Friend
Bitter & Sweet
あかりのありか / Akari no Arika
~Interlude~
Banana moon
Love Call (DAISHI DANCE REMIX)

DVD Track listing
Love Call PV
Kubisuji Line PV
Bitter & Sweet PV
"Arigatou! 1 Mannin Kanshasai" Live Digest
Recording documentaries

Charts and sales

2008 albums
Rythem albums